Xenicotela pardalina is a species of beetle in the family Cerambycidae. It was described by Henry Walter Bates in 1884, originally under the genus Monohammus. It is known from Japan.

References

Lamiinae
Beetles described in 1884